The Internal Troops of Kazakhstan (Qazaqstan Ishki ister mınıstrligi ishki áskeri) was a militarized police force that operated in the Republic of Kazakhstan from 1992 to 2014. The Internal Troops formed the basis for what is now the National Guard of Kazakhstan.

History
The Internal Troops was formed by order of the President Nursultan Nazarbayev on 10 January 1992. It was the Kazakh successor to the Soviet Internal Troops and was formed on the basis of Internal Troops based in the Kazakh SSR. It immediately grew effective in its role in suppressing armed domestic conflicts that were mostly caused by terrorism. In March of that same year, the government founded the Republican Guard on the basis of a police unit of the Internal Troops deployed in the Kaskelen District of Almaty. The Internal Troops were disbanded on 21 April 2014 by government orders, transforming the once Soviet-era agency into the present-day National Guard.

Missions
The missions of the Kazakh Internal Troops are as follows:

Guard important cargo during transportation
Guard of corrective institutions and escort convicts and detainees
Maintain of a social order and stop violations the law that risk the ensurance of public safety 
Maintain a state of alertness during national emergency situations (e.g. natural disasters)
Dismantle illegal armed formations
Prevent domestic and foreign terrorism on Kazakh soil

Leadership Structure

The Commander-in-Chief of the Internal Troops was the seniormost post in the Internal Troops, acting as the commanding officer of the entire branch. The incumbent was appointed and dismissed by the President of the Republic of Kazakhstan and reported directly to him/her through the Minister of Internal Affairs. The assistant to the commander-in-chief and the head of all the headquarters directorates was known as the Chief of Staff.

Anthem of the Internal Troops

References

Military units and formations of Kazakhstan
Law enforcement in Kazakhstan
Military units and formations established in 1992
Military units and formations disestablished in 2014
1992 establishments in Kazakhstan
2014 disestablishments in Kazakhstan
Defunct gendarmeries